Pilati is a surname. 

People with this surname include:

 Auguste Pilati (1810–1877), French composer
 Mario Pilati (1903–1938), Italian composer
 Stefano Pilati (born 1965), head of design for Yves Saint Laurent (brand)

See also
 (includes occurrences of "Pilati" as genitive form of "Pilate" e.g. "Uxor Pilati")
Pilat (disambiguation)
Pilate (disambiguation)
Pilatus (disambiguation)